Sigang District, alternatively spelled Xigang, is a rural district of about 24,611 residents in Tainan, Taiwan. It is home to two elementary schools, one junior high school, and one high school.

History
After the handover of Taiwan from Japan to the Republic of China in 1945, Sigang was organized as a rural township of Tainan County. On 25 December 2010, Tainan County was merged with Tainan City and Sigang was upgraded to a district of the city.

Administrative divisions
The district consists of Xigang, Nanhai, Gangtung, Shelin, Houying, Yingxi, Jinsha, Liucuo, Zhulin, Yongle, Xinfu and Qingan Village.

Tourist attractions
 Dajhong Temple
 Hubi Temple
 Temple of the Martial God

See also
 Tainan

References

External links

 

Districts of Tainan